This is a list of Cambodian provinces (khaet) by Human Development Index as of 2021, including the autonomous municipality of Phnom Penh. Some provinces are grouped together and their aggregate HDI are calculated.

References

Cambodia
Human Development Index
Provinces by Human Development Index
HDI